Anne Blake is an 1852 melodrama by the British writer John Westland Marston.  It premiered at the Princess's Theatre in London on 28 October 1852. The original cast included Charles Kean as Thorold, Walter Lacy as Llaniston, Ellen Kean as Anne Blake. The same year it appeared at the Broadway Theatre in New York.

References

Bibliography
 Booth, Michael R. Prefaces to English Nineteenth-century Theatre. Manchester University Press, 1980.
 Taylor, George. Players and Performances in the Victorian Theatre. Manchester University Press, 1993.
 Tucker, Herbert F (ed.) A New Companion to Victorian Literature and Culture. John Wiley & Sons, 2014.

1852 plays
West End plays
British plays
Tragedy plays
Plays set in Wales
Plays by John Westland Marston